The 1987 NCAA Division II Soccer Championship was the 16th annual tournament held by the NCAA to determine the top men's Division II college soccer program in the United States.

Southern Connecticut State defeated Cal State Northridge, 2–0, to win their first Division II national title. The Fighting Owls (17-1-3) were coached by Bob Dikranian.

The final match was played on December 5 in Tampa, Florida.

Bracket

Final

See also  
 NCAA Division I Men's Soccer Championship
 NCAA Division III Men's Soccer Championship
 NAIA Men's Soccer Championship

References 

NCAA Division II Men's Soccer Championship
NCAA Division II Men's Soccer Championship
NCAA Division II Men's Soccer Championship
NCAA Division II Men's Soccer Championship
Soccer in Florida